Adana Half Marathon is an IAAF international athletic event that takes place in Adana annually since 2011. The marathon is organized the first Sunday following January 5, the independence day of Adana. Master Men, Master Women and Wheelchair competitions, as well as 4 km Public Run are held during the event.

Past winners

Key:

2011
The first marathon was held on January 9 on a national level with the participation of 223 athletes nationwide. A total of 10700TL awarded to the winners. Public Run is conducted on a 4 km course with 750 participants.

Winners;

2012
In 2012, the marathon gained IAAF International Marathon status and took place on January 8 with some changes to the racecourse. 610 athletes from 10 nations raced at the half marathon. Due to the rain, participation to the 4 km Public Run was lower than last year.

The half marathon started from Atatürk Park and headed north to Central Train Station, then south on Ziyapaşa boulevard, turning east just south of the Atatürk Park, heading to the old town streets, crossing Taşköprü, returning to Seyhan district, going north along the both banks of the river and returning to Merkez Park and ending at the park center. The total prize given to winners in 2012 was raised to 35000TL. Winners of Master Men and Master Women races both received 5000TL, winners of Wheelchair men and women races received 750TL each. 4 km Public Run also started from Atatürk Park and ended in Merkez Park. Participants for the Public Run were awarded with certificates.

This year race for men's was dominated by international athletes though the results were not better than last year. Among the women, Bahar Doğan again won the title and also breaking marathon record for women.

Winners;

References

External links
 Adana Sports and Youth Services Directorate
 Adana Yarı Maratonu Resmi İnternet Sitesi

Half marathons in Turkey
Sport in Adana
Festivals in Adana
Annual events in Turkey
Recurring sporting events established in 2011
2011 establishments in Turkey
Winter events in Turkey